Franck Turpin (born January 27, 1977, in Lille) is a French former professional football player.

He played on the professional level in Ligue 1 for Lille OSC.

External links

1977 births
Living people
French footballers
Ligue 1 players
Lille OSC players
Calais RUFC players
Pau FC players
Gap HAFC players
Association football defenders